West Lindfield, New South Wales may refer to:

 the western section of Lindfield, New South Wales
 the suburb of Bradfield, New South Wales, absorbed by Lindfield in 1977.